David Andrew Sanders (August 29, 1979), is a retired Major League Baseball pitcher.

External links

1979 births
Living people
Chicago White Sox players
Major League Baseball pitchers
Baseball players from Oklahoma
Sportspeople from Oklahoma City
Arizona League White Sox players
Winston-Salem Warthogs players
Birmingham Barons players
Charlotte Knights players
Barton Cougars baseball players